Two ships of the Royal Australian Navy have been named HMAS Warrego, for the Warrego River in Queensland. 

 , a  commissioned in 1912 and serving until 1928
 , a  commissioned in 1940 and serving until 1966

Battle honours
Seven battle honours have been earned by ships named HMAS Warrego:
Rabaul 1914
Adriatic 1917–18
Darwin 1942
Pacific 1941–45
New Guinea 1942
Lingayen Gulf 1945
Borneo 1945

References

Royal Australian Navy ship names